József Kozma (24 March 1925 – 25 October 1994) was a Hungarian basketball player. He competed in the men's tournament at the 1948 Summer Olympics.

References

External links
 

1925 births
1994 deaths
Hungarian men's basketball players
Olympic basketball players of Hungary
Basketball players at the 1948 Summer Olympics
People from Zalaegerszeg
Sportspeople from Zala County